Dittman is a surname. Notable people with the surname include:

 Bernie Dittman (1927–2006), longtime owner, president, and general manager of radio station s WABB 
 Earl Dittman (born  1960), owner and film critic for Wireless Magazines
 Henry Dittman (born 1971), American voice actor/actor 
 Kevin C. Dittman (born 1960), American computer scientist, IT consultant and Professor
 Mick Dittman (born 1952), retired Australian Racing Hall of Fame jockey

See also
Dittmar